The 2003 Toyota Grand Prix of Long Beach was the third round of the 2003 CART World Series season, held on April 13, 2003 on the streets of Long Beach, California. This race was a new low in TV ratings for the series. Only 69,000 people watched the race on SPEED Channel, less than the 95,000 who attended the race.

Qualifying results

Rodolfo Lavín missed the first qualification session after a crashing during practice.

Race

Caution flags

Lap leaders

 New Race Record Paul Tracy 1:56:01.792
 Average Speed 91.590 mph

External links
 Full Weekend Times & Results

Long Beach
Grand Prix of Long Beach